April - Privateer Woodes Rogers and the ships Duke and Duchess raid Guayaquil in the Viceroyalty of Peru.
December 22 - Rogers captures the Desengaño, one of the two Manila galleons, off Cabo San Lucas.  Rogers is wounded.
December 25 - Rogers's Duke and Duchess attack the Begoña, the larger of the two Manila galleons, and are repulsed with heavy losses.

Piracy
Piracy by year
1709 in military history